Dashiqiao is a city in Liaoning, China.

Dashiqiao may also refer to:
Dashiqiao Subdistrict, Zhengzhou, in Henan
Dashiqiao Subdistrict, Meishan, in Dongpo District, Meishan, Sichuan
 Dashiqiao, Jianghua (大石桥乡), a township of Jianghua Yao Autonomous County, Hunan
Anji Bridge, or Dashi Qiao, bridge in Hebei, China